Amy Davidson is an American actress. She is known for playing Kerry Hennessy in the ABC sitcom 8 Simple Rules.

Early life and education
Born in Phoenix, Davidson was raised by educators. Her father was a principal at El  Mirage Elementary School, and her mother was an English teacher at Desert Foothills Junior High School. Her parents enrolled her in dance classes as a young child. While attending Shadow Mountain High School, she began appearing in advertisements. Her acting coach encouraged her to move to Hollywood.

Career
After appearing in the TV movie The Truth About Jane and an episode of the drama series Judging Amy, she was cast in the Mary-Kate and Ashley Olsen series So Little Time. 
Beginning in 2002, she then portrayed Kerry Hennessy in all 76 episodes of the aforementioned 8 Simple Rules. She guest-starred on the sitcom Malcolm in the Middle and in the Hallmark Channel film Annie's Point opposite Betty White and Richard Thomas. Other roles include the film Goyband, in which she stars as a young Orthodox Jewish girl who falls for an ex-boyband pop star (Adam Pascal) who performs at her family's hotel in the Catskill Mountains. 

Davidson also runs a fashion and lifestyle blog.

Personal life
Davidson married actor Kacy Lockwood on May 1, 2010. On November 2, 2015, Davidson announced on Instagram that they were expecting their first child. She gave birth to their son on March 1, 2016.

Filmography

Film

Television

References

External links

Living people
20th-century American actresses
21st-century American actresses
Actresses from Phoenix, Arizona
American television actresses
Year of birth missing (living people)